Chang Yu-sheng (also: Tom Yusheng Chang or ; June 7, 1966 – November 12, 1997) was a Taiwanese pop vocalist, songwriter and record producer. Born in 1966, Chang was the eldest among his other four siblings whose mother is Atayal and father a veteran of the ROC military. Being influenced deeply by Western rock music, he had participated in two metal bands at university before he gained publicity with a beverage tie-in ballad "My Future isn't a Pipe Dream" in 1988. In that year, Chang also released his debut album "Always Missing You" to a success, selling 350 thousand records within the regions, before singing the soundtrack of a popular movie Seven Wolves starring him as one of the leading roles. After his graduation in 1989, he was nominated "The Best New Artist" in th for his second album "Miss Me" with most songs co-written by himself. He developed his career as a singer-songwriter since then, endeavoring different genres of contemporary music and attempting to introduce them to the general public despite ups and downs. With moderate to low commercial successes of his subsequent albums, Chang focused more on backstage roles, including music production and songwriting for theater performances. He introduced A-Mei, a Puyuma and pub singer, to his record label whom he met during causal visits. Believing in her potential, Chang became A-Mei's vocal tutor, producer and supervisor. Soon after producing A-Mei's debut and second albums, which were released to a huge success in 1996 and 1997, he died at 31 years old. Renowned for his sopranist vocal range, significance to the development of the local music industry and versatility, Chang is widely referred to as "The Magician of Music in Chinese" and among the most prominent figures when it comes to Chinese language music with most of his commercial failure later considered to be masterpieces.

Biography
Chang was born in Magong, Penghu, Taiwan on June 7, 1966. As the eldest child, he had two younger brothers and two younger sisters. His father was a soldier. He graduated from the National Chengchi University. In spare time, he was keen on music, basketball, swimming, and reading. One of his major accomplishment as a producer was to help the pop singer A-mei to achieve mainstream success. He was known for his high vocals, capable of reaching notes up to D#6. Chang died on November 12, 1997, at age 31, after being hospitalized for 24 days, following a car accident taking place on October 20, 1997.

Discography

Awards and nominations

References

External links
 Chang Yu-Sheng memorial page
 Internet Video and Recording Data Index of Chang Yu-Sheng

1966 births
1997 deaths
Taiwanese Mandopop singer-songwriters
Taiwanese guitarists
Taiwanese songwriters
20th-century Taiwanese male singers
National Chengchi University alumni
Road incident deaths in Taiwan
People with disorders of consciousness
People from Penghu County
Musicians from Taichung
Atayal people
20th-century guitarists
Writers from Taichung